Two submarines of the Royal Navy have been named HMS Astute for the characteristic of shrewdness and discernment.

She served in World War II but never saw action against an enemy. She was scrapped in 1970.
She was commissioned into the Royal Navy in 2010.

Royal Navy ship names